Caldes may refer to:

Places
Italy
 Caldes, comune in Trentino

Spain
 Caldes de Malavella, municipality in the comarca of Selva
 Caldes de Montbui, municipality in the comarca of Vallès Oriental
 Caldes d'Estrac, municipality in the comarca of Maresme

Other
 Caldes rabbit, Spanish breed of rabbit